The NRE 2GS14B is a low-emissions diesel switcher locomotive built by National Railway Equipment. At least 7 2GS14B genset locomotives have been produced to date, with the majority of these units being manufactured at NREC's Mount Vernon shops in Southern Illinois.

Original Buyers

References

External links
 National Railway Equipment  – Official N-ViroMotive Product Page

B-B locomotives
NRE locomotives
Railway locomotives introduced in 2005
Diesel-electric locomotives of the United States
EPA Tier 2-compliant locomotives of the United States
Rebuilt locomotives
Standard gauge locomotives of the United States